Christine Doerner (born 18 July 1952) is a Luxembourgish politician, advocate, and notary.  She has been a member of the Chamber of Deputies since the 2004 election, and has also sat as a member of Bettembourg communal council since 2000.  She has been a member of the Christian Social People's Party since 1974.

External links
  Christine Doerner biography on the Chamber of Deputies' official website

Members of the Chamber of Deputies (Luxembourg)
Christian Social People's Party politicians
20th-century Luxembourgian lawyers
Luxembourgian notaries
1952 births
Living people
People from Bettembourg
Councillors in Bettembourg
20th-century Luxembourgian women politicians
21st-century Luxembourgian women politicians
20th-century Luxembourgian politicians
21st-century Luxembourgian politicians
21st-century Luxembourgian lawyers